The Queenston Stakes is a Canadian Thoroughbred horse race run annually at Woodbine Racetrack in Toronto, Ontario. Run in early May, the stakes race is open to three-year-old horses who were foaled in the Province of Ontario. Raced over a distance of seven furlongs on Polytrack synthetic dirt, it currently offers a purse of $150,000.

The Queenston Stakes was first run in 1956 at Fort Erie Racetrack in Fort Erie, Ontario as a  furlong sprint race. From 1976 through 1979 the race was hosted by Greenwood Raceway then in 1980 it was moved to Woodbine Racetrack. Since inception, it has been run at various distances:
 5 furlongs :  1958, 1961
 5.5 furlongs : 1956-1957, 1959
 6 furlongs : 1960, 1962-1975 
 6.5 furlongs : 1976
 7 furlongs : 1977–present

The race was run in two divisions in 1960, 1961, and 1976.

Records
Speed  record: 
 1:20.97 - Essence Hit Man (2010)

Most wins by a jockey:
 4 - Robin Platts (1972, 1974, 1977, 1990)
 4 - David Clark (1980, 2000, 2004, 2007)

Most wins by a trainer:
 4 - Yonnie Starr (1960 (2), 1968, 1971)
 4 - Gil Rowntree (1974, 1975, 1977, 1990)
 4 - Robert P. Tiller (1989, 1998, 2001, 2004)

Most wins by an owner:
 3 - Jean-Louis Lévesque (1968, 1971, 1983)
 3 - Stafford Farms (1974, 1975, 1977)

Winners

References
 Queenston Stakes at Pedigree Query
 The 2010 Queenston Stakes at Woodbine Entertainment

Restricted stakes races in Canada
Flat horse races for three-year-olds
Recurring sporting events established in 1956
Woodbine Racetrack